Andrew I the White or the Catholic ( or ;  1015 – before 6 December 1060) was King of Hungary from 1046 to 1060. He descended from a younger branch of the Árpád dynasty. After spending fifteen years in exile, he ascended the throne during an extensive revolt of the pagan Hungarians. He strengthened the position of Christianity in the Kingdom of Hungary and successfully defended its independence against the Holy Roman Empire.

His efforts to ensure the succession of his son, Solomon, resulted in the open revolt of his brother, Béla. Béla dethroned Andrew by force in 1060. Andrew suffered severe injuries during the fighting and died before his brother was crowned king.

Early life

Childhood (c. 1015–1031)

Medieval sources provide two contradictory reports of the parents of Andrew, and his two brothers, Levente and Béla. For instance, the Chronicle of Zagreb and Saint Gerard's Life write that their father was Vazul, a grandson of Taksony, Grand Prince of the Hungarians ( c. 955 – c. 970). The Illuminated Chronicle and other medieval sources write of Vazul's relationship with "some girl" from the Tátony clan who bore his sons, who thus "were not born of a true marriage-bed". According to a concurrent tradition, which has been preserved by most chronicles, the three princes were the sons of Vazul's brother, Ladislas the Bald. Modern historians, who reject the latter report, agree that Andrew and his brothers were the sons of Vazul and his concubine from the Tátony clan. According to the historian Gyula Kristó, Andrew was the second among Vazul's three sons. He writes that Andrew was born around 1015.

In exile (1031–1046)

According to medieval chronicles, Vazul was blinded during the reign of his cousin, King Stephen I, the first Christian monarch of Hungary (r. 997–1038). The king ordered Vazul's mutilation after the death, in 1031, of Emeric, his only son surviving infancy. The contemporary Annals of Altaich writes that the king himself ordered the mutilation of one of his kinsmen, who had strong claim to the throne, in an attempt to ensure a peaceful succession to his own sister's son, Peter Orseolo. The same source adds that the king expelled his blinded cousin's three sons from Hungary. According to the contrasting report of the Hungarian chronicles, King Stephen wanted to save the young princes' lives from their enemies in the royal court and "counselled them with all speed" to depart from Hungary.

Exiled from Hungary, Andrew and his brothers settled in the court of Duke Oldřich of Bohemia (r. 1012–1033). Here they came across King Mieszko II of Poland (r. 1025–1031, 1032–1034) who likewise took refuge in Bohemia after his opponents had expelled him from his kingdom. The Polish monarch regained his crown and returned to Poland in 1032. Andrew, Béla and Levente, whose "condition of life was poor and mean" in Bohemia, followed Mieszko II who received them "kindly and honourably" in Poland. After the youngest among them, Béla, married a daughter of Mieszko II, Andrew and Levente decided to depart from Poland, because they "felt that they would be living in Poland under their brother's shadow", according to Simon of Kéza.

Hungarian chronicles have preserved a story full of fabulous or anachronistic details of the two brothers' ensuing wanderings. For instance, they narrate that Andrew and Levente were captured by Cumans, but the latter only arrived in Europe in the 1050s. Having faced many hardships, Andrew and Levente established themselves in the court of Yaroslav the Wise, Grand Prince of Kiev (r. 1019–1054) in the late 1030s. The grand prince gave his daughter Anastasia in marriage to Andrew. Kristó writes that Andrew, who had up to that time remained pagan, was baptized on this occasion.

Return to Hungary (1046)

In the meantime, King Peter Orseolo, who had succeeded King Stephen in Hungary in 1038, alienated many lords and prelates from himself, especially when he solemnly recognized the suzerainty of the Holy Roman Emperor, Henry III in 1045. According to the Illuminated Chronicle, the discontented lords, "seeing the sufferings of their people", assembled in Csanád (Cenad, Romania). They agreed to send envoys to Andrew and Levente in Kiev in order to persuade them to return to Hungary. Fearing "some treacherous ambush", the two brothers only set out after the agents they had sent to Hungary confirmed that the Hungarians were ripe for an uprising against the king.

By the time the two brothers decided to return, a revolt had broken out in Hungary. It was dominated by pagans who captured many clergymen and mercilessly slaughtered them. Andrew and Levente met the rebels at Abaújvár. The Illuminated Chronicle narrates how the pagans urged the dukes "to allow the whole people to live according to the rites of the pagans, to kill the bishops and the clergy, to destroy the churches, to throw off the Christian faith and to worship idols". The same source adds that Andrew and Levente gave in to all their demands, "for otherwise they would not fight" for them against King Peter.

The Annals of Altaich states that Andrew "savagely raged against the flock of the Holy Church". Even so, Bishop Gerard of Csanád and four other prelates were ready to join Andrew, but the pagans captured and slaughtered three of them (including Gerard) at Buda. King Peter decided to flee from Hungary and take refuge in Austria. However, Andrew's envoys tricked the king into returning before he reached the frontier, and they captured and blinded him.

Reign

Coronation (1046–1047)

Most Hungarian lords and the prelates opposed the restoration of paganism. They preferred the devout Christian Andrew to his pagan brother Levente, even if, at least according to Kristó and Steinhübel, the latter was the eldest among Vazul's three sons. The Hungarian chronicles write that Levente, who died in short time, did not oppose his brother's ascension to the throne. The three bishops who had survived the pagan uprising crowned Andrew in Székesfehérvár in the last quarter of 1046 or in the spring of 1047. Historian Ferenc Makk writes that Andrew was crowned with a crown that the Byzantine Emperor Constantine IX Monomachos had sent to him. Nine enamelled plaques from this golden crown were unearthed in Nyitraivánka (Ivanka pri Nitre, Slovakia) in the 19th century. Andrew soon broke with his pagan supporters, restored Christianity and declared pagan rites illegal. According to Kosztolnyik, Andrew's epithets (the White or the Catholic) are connected to these events.

Wars with the Holy Roman Empire (1047–1053)

The contemporaneous Hermann of Reichenau narrates that Andrew "sent frequent envoys with humble entreaties" to Emperor Henry III, proposing "an annual tribute and faithful service" if the emperor recognized his reign. Andrew persuaded his brother, Béla, to return from Poland to Hungary in 1048. He also granted his brother one third of the kingdom with the title of duke. Béla's duchy comprised two regions which were centered on Nyitra (Nitra, Slovakia) and Bihar (Biharia, Romania).

Skirmishes on the frontier between Hungary and the Holy Roman Empire first occurred in 1050. Emperor Henry invaded Hungary in August 1051, but Andrew and Béla successfully applied scorched earth tactics against the imperial troops and forced them to withdraw. Legend says that the Vértes Hills near Székesfehérvár were named after the armours—vért in Hungarian—which were discarded by the retreating German soldiers.

Andrew initiated new peace negotiations with the emperor and promised to pay an annual tribute, but his offers were refused. Next summer, the emperor returned to Hungary and laid siege to Pressburg (Bratislava, Slovakia). Zotmund, "a most skilful swimmer" scuttled the emperor's ships. After Pope Leo IX mediated a peace treaty, the emperor lifted the siege and withdrew from Hungary. Andrew soon refused to fulfill his promises made under duress, and even allied with Conrad I, Duke of Bavaria, a prominent opponent of Emperor Henry III.

Succession crisis and death (1053–1060)

Andrew's queen, Anastasia, gave birth to a son, named Solomon in 1053. Andrew attempted to make his son's succession secure, even against his brother, Béla, who had a strong claim to succeed Andrew according to the traditional principle of agnatic seniority.

The brothers' relationship did not deteriorate immediately after Solomon's birth. In the deed of the foundation of the Tihany Abbey, a Benedictine monastery established in 1055 by Andrew, Duke Béla was listed among the lords witnessing the act. This charter, although primarily written in Latin, contains the earliest extant text—Feheruuaru rea meneh hodu utu rea ("on the military road which leads to Fehérvár")—written in Hungarian. Andrew also established a lavra for Orthodox hermits in Tihany and an Orthodox monastery near Visegrád. The Third Book of Law of King Ladislaus I of Hungary (r. 1077–1095) refers to an "estate survey of the judge Sarkas" under "King Andrew and Duke Béla". According to György Györffy, the serfs of the royal domains were registered during this survey which took place around 1056.

Andrew suffered a stroke which paralyzed him. In an attempt to strengthen his son's claim to the throne, he had the four-year-old Solomon crowned in the one-year-long period beginning in the autumn of 1057. For the same purpose, Andrew also arranged the engagement of his son with Judith—a daughter of the late Emperor Henry III, and sister of the new German monarch, Henry IV (r. 1056–1105)—in September 1058. Thereafter, according to an episode narrated by most Hungarian chronicles, the king invited Duke Béla to a meeting at Tiszavárkony. At their meeting, Andrew seemingly offered his brother to freely choose between a crown and a sword, which were the symbols of the kingdom and the ducatus, respectively. Duke Béla, who had previously been informed by his partisans in Andrew's court that he would be murdered on the king's order if he opted for the crown, chose the sword.

However, Béla, who actually had no intention of renouncing his claim to succeed his brother in favor of his nephew, fled to Poland and sought military assistance from Duke Boleslaus II of Poland (r. 1058–1079). With Duke Boleslaus's support, Béla returned to Hungary at the head of Polish troops. On the other hand, the Dowager Empress Agnes—who governed the Holy Roman Empire in the name of her minor son, Henry IV—sent Bavarian, Bohemian and Saxon troops to assist Andrew.

The decisive battle was fought in the regions east of the river Tisza. Andrew suffered injuries and lost the battle. He attempted to flee to the Holy Roman Empire, but his brother's partisans routed his retinue at Moson. The Annals of Niederaltaich narrates that wagons and horses trampled him in the battlefield. Mortally wounded, Andrew was captured and taken by his brother's partisans to Zirc where "he was treated with neglect", according to the Illuminated Chronicle. Andrew died in the royal manor there before his brother was crowned king on 6 December 1060. Andrew was buried in the crypt of the church of the Tihany Abbey.

Family

Andrew's wife, Anastasia, was the daughter of Grand Duke Yaroslav I the Wise of Kiev by his wife, Ingegerd, who herself was the daughter of King Olof Skötkonung of Sweden. Andrew married Anastasia, who was born in about 1020, around 1038. Their first child, Adelaide, was born around 1040. She became the wife of Vratislaus II of Bohemia, who was initially Duke and, from 1085, King of Bohemia. Andrew and Anastasia's first son, Solomon, was born in 1053, their second son, David, some years later. Neither Solomon nor David fathered sons; the male line of Andrew's family died out with their deaths by the end of the 11th century.

Medieval chronicles write that Andrew had a natural son, named George, "by a concubine" from the village of Pilismarót. Since his name was popular among Orthodox believers, Gyula Kristó says that his mother may have been a Russian lady-in-waiting of Andrew's queen. The story that the Clan Drummond in Scotland are descended from George and his son Maurice is not accepted by some scholars.

The following family tree presents Andrew's ancestry, his offspring, and some of his relatives mentioned in the article.

*A Khazar, Pecheneg or Volga Bulgarian lady.**Györffy writes that she may have been a member of the Bulgarian Cometopuli dynasty.

Gallery

References

Sources

Primary sources

"Herman of Reichenau, Chronicle" (2008). In Robinson, I. S. Eleventh-Century Germany: The Swabian Chronicles. Manchester University Press. pp. 58–98. .
Simon of Kéza: The Deeds of the Hungarians (Edited and translated by László Veszprémy and Frank Schaer with a study by Jenő Szűcs) (1999). CEU Press. .
The Hungarian Illuminated Chronicle: Chronica de Gestis Hungarorum (Edited by Dezső Dercsényi) (1970). Corvina, Taplinger Publishing. .
"The Laws of King Ladislas I (1077–1095): Book Three". In The Laws of the Medieval Kingdom of Hungary, 1000–1301 (Translated and Edited by János M. Bak, György Bónis, James Ross Sweeney with an essay on previous editions by Andor Czizmadia, Second revised edition, In collaboration with Leslie S. Domonkos) (1999). Charles Schlacks, Jr. Publishers. pp. 15–22. . . . . . (ISBN may be misprinted in the book as 88445-29-2).

Secondary sources

|-

1010s births
1060 deaths
House of Árpád
Kings of Hungary
Year of birth unknown
11th-century Hungarian people